The Great Western Railway (GWR) 5205 Class is a class of 2-8-0T steam locomotives.

History

5205 Class
They were designed for short-haul coal trips from coal mines to ports in South Wales. They were based on the 4200 Class which had been introduced by the Great Western Railway in 1910. The 5205 series were of the same general design and 70 of the 5205 class were built, 5205-5274. They retained the straight frames of the 4200s, but had outside steam pipes and 19" diameter cylinders so were slightly more powerful than their predecessors.

Twenty 5205s, 5255-5274 were converted to the 7200 Class in 1934/6.

5275 Class
Twenty more locomotives to the same general design were built from 1930. This series had curved frames at the front with a raised section of frame over cylinders which were of the same size as the 5205 series. These were 5275 to 5294. These were all rebuilt as 7200 Class in 1934 without seeing significant use.  Ten more, 5255-5264 were built in 1940, reusing numbers from 5205 class members which had also been rebuilt as 7200 Class.

Preservation
Three examples of the 5205 class have been preserved with two of them 5224 and 5239 having run in preservation. No members of the 5275 class have been preserved in their original form, but two survive in rebuilt form in the 7200 class.

Models

In 2012, Hornby released models of the 5205 class in both BR black and GWR green.

See also 
 List of GWR standard classes with two outside cylinders

References

5205
2-8-0T locomotives
Railway locomotives introduced in 1923
Freight locomotives
Standard gauge steam locomotives of Great Britain
1′D h2t locomotives